Digitivalva solidaginis is a moth of the  family Acrolepiidae. It is found in France, Spain and Russia.

The larvae feed on Dittrichia viscosa and Solidago virgaurea. They mine the leaves of their host plant. The mine has the form of a corridor, followed by a large, full depth blotch. In the corridor, the frass is deposited in a central line, while it is scattered in the blotch. Pupation takes place outside of the mine in a reticulate cocoon. The larvae can be found in June.

References

Acrolepiidae
Moths described in 1859
Moths of Europe